Easley is a city in Pickens County (with parts extending into Anderson County) in the State of South Carolina. Most of the city lies in Pickens County, with a small portion of the city in Anderson County.

In 2001, Easley hosted the Big League World Series for the first time, and continued to host the tournament annually until it was disbanded in 2016. In 2017, the Senior League World Series moved to Easley as the host for the annual tournament. The Upper South Carolina State Fair is located in Easley and is held annually in early September.

History

In 1791 Washington District was established by the state legislature out of the former Cherokee territory. Rockville was also created in 1791 but changed to Pickensville in 1792. Pickensville became the district seat of Washington District which was then composed of Greenville and Pendleton Counties. In 1798 Washington District was divided into Greenville and Pendleton Districts. In 1828 Pendleton District was divided further with the lower portion becoming Anderson County and the upper becoming Pickens County named after Andrew Pickens.

Col. Robert Elliott Holcombe became a co-founder of the town by starting off as a farmer and timber mill owner in the area. His farming ventures enabled him to establish the storeroom in 1845 as the first business in the area. The namesake of the town was William King Easley. Easley was born in Pickens County, South Carolina in 1825. Easley and four others from Greenville represented the Greenville area in the South Carolina Secession Convention. When the American Civil War erupted, Easley raised a company of cavalry from Greenville and Pickens counties. During the war Easley served as a major in the Confederate Army.

After the civil war Easley became a local attorney and persuaded the Atlanta and Charlotte Air Line Railway to be established through Pickensville by raising $100,000 to invest in the railroad. Holcombe was considered to be the first citizen of Easley, building the first dwelling and train depot in the town from his family's lumber mill. Holcombe became the first mayor of the town and was also the first agent of the train depot. The town of Easley was chartered in 1873. At the time, the consensus was that it should be named Holcombe or Holcombetown, but Col. Holcombe said that he didn't think Holcombe was a very attractive name and that Easley sounded better. The Pickensville Post Office became Easley Post Office in 1875. The railroad transformed Easley into an industrious and thriving textile town. The Easley Textile Company, later known as Swirl Inc., came to Easley in 1953. The construction of U.S. Route 123 helped establish retail and new business to Easley. On April 25, 1951, a department store was on fire threatening many buildings in downtown Easley but the quick response of the fire department extinguished the fire.

In 1968, NASCAR driver Curtis Turner caused a telephone outage in Easley while landing his airplane on the town's main street.

Geography

Butch Womack is the elected mayor.

Demographics

2020 census

As of the 2020 United States census, there were 22,921 people, 8,738 households, and 5,571 families residing in the city.

2000 census
As of the census of 2000, there were 17,754 people, 7,227 households, and 5,058 families residing in the city. The population density was 1,668.8 people per square mile (644.3/km2). There were 7,932 housing units at an average density of 745.6 per square mile (287.8/km2). The racial makeup of the city was 85.35% White, 11.81% African American, 0.14% Native American, 0.52% Asian, 0.03% Pacific Islander, 1.25% from other races, and 0.90% from two or more races. Hispanic or Latino of any race were 2.82% of the population.

There were 7,227 households, out of which 30.6% had children under the age of 18 living with them, 53.9% were married couples living together, 12.3% had a female householder with no husband present, and 30.0% were non-families. 25.7% of all households were made up of individuals, and 11.0% had someone living alone who was 65 years of age or older. The average household size was 2.43 and the average family size was 2.90.

In the city, the population was spread out, with 23.5% under the age of 18, 8.5% from 18 to 24, 29.7% from 25 to 44, 23.6% from 45 to 64, and 14.7% who were 65 years of age or older. The median age was 37 years. For every 100 females, there were 92.1 males. For every 100 females age 18 and over, there were 88.6 males.

The median income for a household in the city was $38,204, and the median income for a family was $47,867. Males had a median income of $35,399 versus $25,443 for females. The per capita income for the city was $20,965. About 8.4% of families and 10.9% of the population were below the poverty line, including 12.2% of those under age 18 and 11.9% of those age 65 or over.

Military

National Guard
Battery B, 2nd Battalion, 263rd Army Air Missile Defense Command, is based at the Easley National Guard Armory in Easley.

Recruiting
 U.S. Army Recruiting Substation
 U.S. Marine Corps Recruiting Substation

JROTC
 Easley High School Navy JROTC Battalion
Awarded Distinguished Unit 20 consecutive years in a row by NJROTC Area 6.

Education
Public school services are provided to Easley by the School District of Pickens County. 7 of their schools provide public education to the children of Easley.
 Easley High School (Grades: 9–12)
 R.H. Gettys Middle School (Grades: 6–8)
 West End Elementary School (Grades: K4-5)
 Forest Acres Elementary School (Grades:K4-5)
 East End Elementary School (Grades: K4-5)
 Crosswell Elementary School (Grades: K4-5)
 McKissick Elementary School (Grades: K4-5)  
Most preschools in the city are private and provided by churches. There are also several private schools, such as Easley Christian School.
Tri-County Technical College maintains a campus in Easley. Clemson University is also located in nearby Clemson. Southern Wesleyan University is located in nearby Central, Greenville Technical College and Furman University are located nearby in Greenville.

Easley has a public library, a branch of the Pickens County Library System.

Notable people
Kyle Benjamin, NASCAR race car driver
Shannon Forrest, Country-Rock studio session drummer. Road drummer for rock group Toto. Son of gospel musician/producer Otis Forrest.
E. Allison Hagood, Professor of Psychology at Arapahoe Community College in Littleton, Colorado and author of Your Baby's Best Shot
Kayla Watson, Producer of the Good Mythical Morning Youtube Show
Kimberly Hampton, U.S. Army captain, first female military pilot to be killed by hostile fire
Wes Knight, Major League Soccer player for the Vancouver Whitecaps FC
Stanley Morgan, National Football League player for the New England Patriots
Rob Stanifer, Former Major League Baseball player for the Florida Marlins, Boston Red Sox, and the Hiroshima Toyo Carp
Jasmine Twitty, associate judge for the Easley Municipal court.  Youngest appointed judge in America.

References

External links
 
 Greater Easley Chamber of Commerce

 
Cities in South Carolina
Cities in Anderson County, South Carolina
Cities in Pickens County, South Carolina
Upstate South Carolina